Carreras is a surname of Spanish origin. Notable people with the surname include:

Amanda Carreras (born 1990), Gibraltarian tennis player
Dionisio Carreras (1890–1949), Spanish long-distance runner
 Enrique Carreras (1925–1995), Peruvian-Argentine filmmaker
Francesc de Carreras (born 1943), Spanish jurist and political activist, son of Narcís de Carreras
Francisco de las Carreras (1809–1870), Argentine lawyer, judge and politician
Georgina Carreras (born 1989), Spanish football player
Gonzalo Carreras (born 1989), Argentine sprint canoeist
James Carreras (1909–1990), British film producer
Joaquim Carreras (1894–1968), Spanish philosopher, brother of Tomàs Carreras
Joan Carreras (born 1962), Spanish journalist and writer
José Carreras (born 1946), Spanish opera singer
Juan Manuel Carreras (born 1962), Mexican politician
Julio Carreras (h), Argentine writer, artist and musician
 Lluís Carreras (born 1972), Spanish football player and coach
 Narcís de Carreras, Spanish lawyer and former president of Barcelona FC
Mario Carreras (born 1966), Argentine rugby union player
Mateo Carreras (born 1999), Argentine rugby union player
Mercedes Carreras (born 1940), Argentine actress
Michael Carreras (1927––1994), British film producer and director, son of James Carreras
Olivier Carreras, French filmmaker and TV presenter
Ricardo Carreras (born 1949), U.S. American boxer
Saguier Carreras, Paraguayan football (soccer) player
Santiago Carreras (born 1998), Argentine rugby union player 
Tomàs Carreras (1879–1954), Spanish philosopher and politician, brother of Joaquim Carreras

See also 

 Carrera (surname)

Spanish-language surnames